The Wilderness of Zin or the Desert of Zin (Mīḏbar Ṣīn) is a geographic term with two meanings, one biblical and one modern Israeli, which are not necessarily identical.

Biblical Desert of Zin
The Desert of Zin is an area mentioned by the Torah as containing Kadesh-Barnea, and it is therefore also referred to as the "Wilderness of Kadesh".

Biblical Desert of Sin
Similarly named is the Wilderness of Sin. Modern English translations make a distinction, but it is not easily evident from the Septuagint and the Vulgate which, apart from a couple of instances, render both Hebrew ṣīn and sîn as "Sin". The "Wilderness of Sin" is mentioned by the Bible as being adjacent to Mount Sinai; some consider Sinai to refer to al-Madhbah at Petra, adjacent to the central Arabah, and it is thus eminently possible that the "Wilderness of Sin" and the "Wilderness of Zin" are the same place.

Identification
As of 1899, most scholars, as well as traditional sources, identified the Wilderness of Zin as being part of the Arabah.

Modern Desert of Zin
Modern Israel has adopted the name for a specific southern desert area, which might or might not be identical with the biblical Wilderness of Zin.

It was this region that the British Arabist and adventurer T. E. Lawrence was exploring in a military survey for the British army when he was drafted into service. His expedition, funded by the Palestine Exploration Fund, included a survey of the entire Negev Desert.

Important Bird Area

Significant bird populations for which the IBA was designated include sand partridges, common cranes, MacQueen's bustards, black and white storks, pallid scops owls, desert tawny owls, Egyptian and griffon vultures, sooty and lanner falcons, Arabian babblers, hooded wheatears and Sinai rosefinches.

References

Bibliography
 Woolley, C. Leonard and Lawrence, T. E., The Wilderness of Zin. Rev. 3rd ed. (Winona Lake, Eisenbrauns, in association with Stacey International, London, 2003).

Stations of the Exodus
Torah places
Deserts of Israel
Important Bird Areas of Israel